Archosargus probatocephalus, the sheepshead, is a marine fish that grows to , but commonly reaches . It is deep and compressed in body shape, with five or six dark bars on the side of the body over a gray background. It has sharp dorsal spines. Its diet consists of oysters, clams, and other bivalves, and barnacles, fiddler crabs, and other crustaceans. It has a hard mouth, with several rows of stubby teeth – the frontal ones closely resembling human teeth – which help crush the shells of prey.

Sheepshead Bay in Brooklyn is named after this fish.

Range
The sheepshead is found in coastal waters along the western Atlantic, from Nova Scotia to Brazil, but the greatest concentration is around southwest Florida. Although the Sheepshead Bay section of Brooklyn, in New York City, was named after the fish, it is now rarely found that far north. However they just recently started to return to the area in small numbers, with a few being caught in the Jamaica Bay and on the Rockaway Reef.

Fishing
As sheepshead feed on bivalves and crustaceans, successful baits include shrimp, sand fleas (mole crabs), clams, fiddler crabs, and mussels. Sheepshead have a knack for stealing bait, so a small hook is necessary. Locating sheepshead with a boat is not difficult: fishermen look for rocky bottoms or places with obstructions, jetties, and the pilings of bridges and piers.

Parasites
As with other fish, the  sheepshead has a variety of parasites. One of them is the monogenean Microcotyle archosargi, which is parasitic on its gills.

References

External links

 Archosargus probatocephalus Smithsonian Marine Station
 Sheedshead Information Florida Shore Fishing Page
 

Sparidae
Commercial fish
Sport fish

Fish of the Atlantic Ocean
Fish described in 1792